Grant Hardie (born 27 March 1992) is a Scottish curler from Glasgow. He currently plays third for the Bruce Mouat rink. He is the nephew of 1999 world champion Hammy McMillan.

Career

University
While attending the University of Strathclyde (where he took civil engineering), Hardie played third for the British team at the 2015 Winter Universiade, which was skipped by Kyle Smith. The team would go on to win the bronze medal.

Mixed
Hardie skipped the Scottish team at the 2017 World Mixed Curling Championship. He led his team of Rhiann Macleod, Billy Morton and Barbara McFarlane to a 6-1 record after the group stage. The team then went on to win four straight playoff games en route to winning the gold medal, defeating Canada in the final.

Men's
Before joining the Mouat rink, Hardie succeeded in his own right as a skip. He and teammates Blair Fraser, Dave Reid and Duncan Menzies won the 2017 Aberdeen International Curling Championship, Hardie's first World Curling Tour win. This win qualified the rink for the season-ending Champions Cup, his first Grand Slam event. There, the team went winless, going 0-4. After the season, Hardie joined forces with the 2016 World Junior champion skip, Bruce Mouat.

The new Mouat rink found immediate success on the World Curling Tour, winning the Stu Sells Oakville Tankard and Oakville OCT Fall Classic tour events to begin the season. In their first slam as a team, the 2017 Boost National, the team would win the whole thing, becoming the first Scottish team to win a Grand Slam title. Also, on the tour that season, the team would win the Dumfries Challenger Series and the Aberdeen International Curling Championship. The team had less success at the second slam they played in the 2018 Meridian Canadian Open, failing to make it to the playoffs. Later in the season, the team won the Scottish Men's Curling Championship and defeated the British Olympic team (skipped by Kyle Smith) in a playoff to earn the right to represent Scotland at the 2018 World Men's Curling Championship.

References

External links

1992 births
Living people
Alumni of the University of Strathclyde
Competitors at the 2015 Winter Universiade
Continental Cup of Curling participants
Curlers from Glasgow
European curling champions
Scottish male curlers
Sportspeople from Dumfries
Universiade bronze medalists for Great Britain
Universiade medalists in curling
World mixed curling champions
Curlers at the 2022 Winter Olympics
Olympic curlers of Great Britain
Medalists at the 2022 Winter Olympics
Olympic silver medallists for Great Britain
Olympic medalists in curling
Scottish Olympic medallists